Scrobipalpa is a genus of moths in the family Gelechiidae. Euscrobipalpa has sometimes been treated as a distinct subgenus, or even as a full genus, but is generally no longer recognised as valid, following Ponomarenko & Park (2007).

Species

Scrobipalpa abai Povolný, 1977
Scrobipalpa abstrusa Huemer & Karsholt, 2010
Scrobipalpa acuminatella (Sircom, 1850)
Scrobipalpa acuta (Povolný, 2001)
Scrobipalpa adaptata (Povolný, 2001)
Scrobipalpa admirabilis Bidzilya, 2021
Scrobipalpa aestivans Falkovitsh & Bidzilya, 2003
Scrobipalpa afromontana Bidzilya, 2021
Scrobipalpa aganophthalma (Meyrick, 1931)
Scrobipalpa agassizi Bidzilya, 2021
Scrobipalpa ahasver Povolný, 1969
Scrobipalpa albofusca Povolný, 1971
Scrobipalpa albostriata Povolný, 1977
Scrobipalpa algeriensis Povolný & Bradley, 1965
Scrobipalpa alia (Falkovitsh & Bidzilya, 2006)
Scrobipalpa alterna (Falkovitsh & Bidzilya, 2006)
Scrobipalpa amseli Povolný, 1966
Scrobipalpa anatolica Povolný, 1973
Scrobipalpa aptatella (Walker, 1864)
Scrobipalpa arborealis Povolný, 1978
Scrobipalpa arenaceariella (Powell & Povolný, 2001)
Scrobipalpa arenbergeri Povolný, 1973
Scrobipalpa argentea Povolný, 1969
Scrobipalpa argenteonigra Povolný, 1972
Scrobipalpa artemisiella (Treitschke, 1833)
Scrobipalpa asantesana Bidzilya, 2021
Scrobipalpa atriplex (Busck, 1910)
Scrobipalpa atriplicella (Fischer von Röslerstamm, 1841)
Scrobipalpa audax Povolný, 1966
Scrobipalpa aulorrhoa (Meyrick, 1935)
Scrobipalpa autonoma Povolný, 1969
Scrobipalpa avetjanae Emelyanov & Piskunov, 1982
Scrobipalpa bahai Povolný, 1977
Scrobipalpa bahrainica Povolný, 1966
Scrobipalpa bandiamiri Povolný, 1968
Scrobipalpa bazae Povolný, 1977
Scrobipalpa bidzilyai (Povolry, 2001)
Scrobipalpa bifasciata Povolný, 1971
Scrobipalpa bigoti Povolný, 1973
Scrobipalpa biljurshi Povolný, 1980
Scrobipalpa biskrae Povolný, 1977
Scrobipalpa blapsigona (Meyrick, 1916)
Scrobipalpa bradleyi Povolný, 1971
Scrobipalpa brahmiella (Heyden, 1862)
Scrobipalpa brandbergensis Bidzilya & Mey, 2011
Scrobipalpa brandti Povolný, 1972
Scrobipalpa bulganensis Povolný, 1969
Scrobipalpa burmanni Povolný, 1971
Scrobipalpa bryophiloides Povolný, 1966
Scrobipalpa camphorosmella Nel, 1999
Scrobipalpa candicans (Povolný, 1996)
Scrobipalpa caryocoloides Povolný, 1977
Scrobipalpa caucasica (Povolný, 2001)
Scrobipalpa chersophila (Meyrick, 1909)
Scrobipalpa chetitica Povolný, 1974
Scrobipalpa chinensis Povolný, 1969
Scrobipalpa chitensis (Povolný, 2001)
Scrobipalpa chrysanthemella (Hofmann, 1867)
Scrobipalpa clintoni Povolný, 1968
Scrobipalpa coctans Povolný, 1969
Scrobipalpa concerna Povolný, 1969
Scrobipalpa concreta (Meyrick, 1914)
Scrobipalpa confusa Povolný, 1966
Scrobipalpa consueta (Braun, 1925)
Scrobipalpa corleyi Huemer & Karsholt, 2010
Scrobipalpa corsicamontes Varenne & Nel, 2013
Scrobipalpa costella (Humphreys & Westwood, 1845)
Scrobipalpa crepera (Falkovitsh & Bidzilya, 2006)
Scrobipalpa cryptica Povolný, 1969
Scrobipalpa cultrata Povolný, 1971
Scrobipalpa dagmaris Povolný, 1987
Scrobipalpa dalibori Lvovsky & Piskunov, 1989
Scrobipalpa delattini Povolny, 1969
Scrobipalpa deluccae Povolný, 1966
Scrobipalpa deutschi Huemer & Karsholt, 2010
Scrobipalpa disjectella (Staudinger, 1859)
Scrobipalpa distincta Bidzilya & Li, 2010
Scrobipalpa divergens (Povolný, 2002)
Scrobipalpa diversa (Janse, 1950)
Scrobipalpa divisella (Rebel, 1936)
Scrobipalpa dorsoflava (Povolný, 1996)
Scrobipalpa dorsolutea Huemer & Karsholt, 2010
Scrobipalpa ebertiana Povolný, 1967
Scrobipalpa ephysteroides (Povolný, 1967)
Scrobipalpa eremica Povolný, 1967
Scrobipalpa erexita Bidzilya, 2021
Scrobipalpa ergasima (Meyrick, 1916)
Scrobipalpa erichi Povolný, 1964
Scrobipalpa erichiodes Bidzilya & Li, 2010
Scrobipalpa eschatopis (Meyrick, 1904)
Scrobipalpa ethiopica Bidzilya, 2021
Scrobipalpa etoshensis Bidzilya, 2021
Scrobipalpa extensa Povolný, 1969
Scrobipalpa felixi Povolný, 1978
Scrobipalpa feralella (Zeller, 1872)
Scrobipalpa filia Povolný, 1969
Scrobipalpa flavidinigra Bidzilya & Li, 2010
Scrobipalpa flavimaculata Bidzilya & Li, 2010
Scrobipalpa flavinerva Bidzilya & Li, 2010
Scrobipalpa forsteri Povolný, 1971
Scrobipalpa frugifera Povolný, 1969
Scrobipalpa fusca Bidzilya & Li, 2010
Scrobipalpa gallicella (Constant, 1885)
Scrobipalpa gallicola Falkovitsh & Bidzilya, 2003
Scrobipalpa gecko (Walsingham, 1911)
Scrobipalpa geomicta (Meyrick, 1918)
Scrobipalpa gobica Povolný, 1969
Scrobipalpa gozmanyi Povolný, 1969
Scrobipalpa grisea Povolný, 1969
Scrobipalpa griseata Bidzilya, 2021
Scrobipalpa griseoflava Bidzilya & Budashkin, 2011
Scrobipalpa griseofusella (Toll, 1947)
Scrobipalpa grossoides (Povolný, 2001)
Scrobipalpa guttata Povolný, 1969
Scrobipalpa halimifolia Bidzilya & Budashkin, 2011
Scrobipalpa halimioniella Huemer & Karsholt, 2010
Scrobipalpa halophila Povolný, 1973
Scrobipalpa halymella (Millière, 1864)
Scrobipalpa hannemanni Povolný, 1966
Scrobipalpa halonella (Herrich-Schäffer, 1854)
Scrobipalpa heimi Huemer & Karsholt, 2010
Scrobipalpa helmuti Povolný, 1977
Scrobipalpa hendrikseni Huemer & Karsholt, 2010
Scrobipalpa heratella Povolný, 1967
Scrobipalpa heretica Povolný, 1973
Scrobipalpa hoenei Bidzilya & Li, 2010
Scrobipalpa hungariae (Staudinger, 1871)
Scrobipalpa hyoscyamella (Stainton, 1869)
Scrobipalpa hyssopi Nel, 2003
Scrobipalpa ignorans (Povolný, 1987)
Scrobipalpa incola (Meyrick, 1912)
Scrobipalpa indignella (Staudinger, 1879)
Scrobipalpa inferna Povolný, 1973
Scrobipalpa instabilella (Douglas, 1846)
Scrobipalpa intima (Povolný, 2001)
Scrobipalpa intricata Povolný, 1969
Scrobipalpa jariorum Huemer & Karsholt, 2010
Scrobipalpa kalidii (Falkovitsh & Bidzilya, 2006)
Scrobipalpa karadaghi (Povolný, 2001)
Scrobipalpa karischi Povolný, 1992
Scrobipalpa kasyi Povolný, 1966
Scrobipalpa kasyvartianella Povolný, 1967
Scrobipalpa kaszabi Povolný, 1969
Scrobipalpa keredjensis Povolný, 1968
Scrobipalpa krasilnikovae Piskunov, 1990
Scrobipalpa kumatai Povolný, 1977
Scrobipalpa kurokoi Povolný, 1977
Scrobipalpa kyrana Povolný, 2001
Scrobipalpa lagodes (Meyrick, 1926)
Scrobipalpa laisinca Povolný, 1976
Scrobipalpa latiuncella Bidzilya & Li, 2010
Scrobipalpa leucocephala (Lower, 1893)
Scrobipalpa libanonica Povolný, 1966
Scrobipalpa liui Li & Bidzilya, 2019
Scrobipalpa lutea Povolný, 1977
Scrobipalpa macromaculata (Braun, 1925)
Scrobipalpa magnificella Povolný, 1967
Scrobipalpa manchurica (Matsumura, 1931)
Scrobipalpa manhunkai Povolný, 1979
Scrobipalpa maniaca Povolný, 1969
Scrobipalpa marmorella Povolný, 1969
Scrobipalpa meridioafricana Bidzilya & Mey, 2011
Scrobipalpa meteorica Povolný, 1984
Scrobipalpa meyricki Povolný, 1971
Scrobipalpa minimella Povolný, 1968
Scrobipalpa minimella (Turati, 1929)
Scrobipalpa mixta Huemer & Karsholt, 2010
Scrobipalpa moghrebanella (Lucas, 1937)
Scrobipalpa mongolica Povolný, 1969
Scrobipalpa mongoloides Povolný, 1969
Scrobipalpa monochromella (Constant, 1895)
Scrobipalpa montafghana Povolný, 1968
Scrobipalpa montanella (Chrétien, 1910)
Scrobipalpa monumentella (Chambers, 1877)
Scrobipalpa munita Bidzilya, 2021
Scrobipalpa murinella (Duponchel, 1843)
Scrobipalpa nana Povolný, 1973
Scrobipalpa natalensis Bidzilya, 2021
Scrobipalpa nigrigrisea Bidzilya & Li, 2010
Scrobipalpa nigripuncta Bidzilya & Li, 2010
Scrobipalpa nigristriana Bidzilya, 2021
Scrobipalpa nigrosparsea Povolný, 1969
Scrobipalpa ningxica Li & Bidzilya, 2019
Scrobipalpa nitentella (Fuchs, 1902)
Scrobipalpa niveifacies Povolný, 1977
Scrobipalpa nomias (Meyrick, 1921)
Scrobipalpa nonyma (Turner, 1919)
Scrobipalpa notata (Povolný, 2001)
Scrobipalpa obscurus (Povolný, 1985)
Scrobipalpa obsoletella (Fischer von Röslerstamm, 1841)
Scrobipalpa obtemperata (Meyrick, 1925)
Scrobipalpa occulta (Povolný, 2002)
Scrobipalpa ocellatella (Boyd, 1858)
Scrobipalpa ochracea Bidzilya, 2021
Scrobipalpa ochraceella (Chrétien, 1915)
Scrobipalpa ochromaculata (Lucas, 1950)
Scrobipalpa ochrostigma Bidzilya & Li, 2010
Scrobipalpa ochroxantha Bidzilya, 2021
Scrobipalpa oleksiyella Huemer & Karsholt, 2010
Scrobipalpa omachella (Oberthür, 1888)
Scrobipalpa optima Povolný, 1969
Scrobipalpa orientalis Povolný, 1968
Scrobipalpa otregata Povolný, 1972
Scrobipalpa panjaensis Povolný, 1968
Scrobipalpa paradoxa Piskunov, 1990
Scrobipalpa parki (Povolný, 1993)
Scrobipalpa parvipulex (Walsingham, 1911)
Scrobipalpa pauperella (Heinemann, 1870)
Scrobipalpa perfecta (Povolný, 1996)
Scrobipalpa perinii (Klimesch, 1951)
Scrobipalpa perinoides Povolný, 1967
Scrobipalpa peterseni (Povolný, 1965)
Scrobipalpa phagnalella (Constant, 1895)
Scrobipalpa phelotris (Meyrick, 1909)
Scrobipalpa picta Povolný, 1969
Scrobipalpa planodes (Meyrick, 1918)
Scrobipalpa plesiopicta Povolný, 1969
Scrobipalpa portosanctana (Stainton, 1859)
Scrobipalpa postulatella Huemer & Karsholt, 2010
Scrobipalpa povolnyi Emelyanov & Piskunov, 1982
Scrobipalpa proclivella (Fuchs, 1886)
Scrobipalpa psammophila Li & Bidzilya, 2019
Scrobipalpa pseudolutea Piskunov, 1990
Scrobipalpa pulchra Povolný, 1967
Scrobipalpa punctata (Povolný, 1996)
Scrobipalpa punctulata Li & Bidzilya, 2019
Scrobipalpa puplesisi Piskunov, 1990
Scrobipalpa pustovarovi Piskunov, 1990
Scrobipalpa pyrrhanthes (Meyrick, 1904)
Scrobipalpa rebeli (Preissecker, 1914)
Scrobipalpa reiprichi Povolný, 1984
Scrobipalpa remanella Povolný, 1966
Scrobipalpa remota Povolný, 1972
Scrobipalpa richteri Povolný, 1968
Scrobipalpa rjabovi Piskunov, 1990
Scrobipalpa salicorniae (Hering, 1889)
Scrobipalpa salinella (Zeller, 1847)
Scrobipalpa saltans Wakeham-Dawson, 2012
Scrobipalpa samadensis (Pfaffenzeller, 1870)
Scrobipalpa sattleri Lvovsky & Piskunov, 1989
Scrobipalpa scrobipalpulina Povolný, 1967
Scrobipalpa scutellariaeella (Chambers, 1873)
Scrobipalpa selectella (Caradja, 1920)
Scrobipalpa selectoides Bidzilya, 2021
Scrobipalpa semnani Povolný, 1967
Scrobipalpa septentrionalis Li & Bidzilya, 2019
Scrobipalpa sibila (Meyrick, 1921)
Scrobipalpa similis Povolný, 1973
Scrobipalpa sindibad Povolný, 1981
Scrobipalpa sinica Bidzilya & Li, 2010
Scrobipalpa skulei Huemer & Karsholt, 2010
Scrobipalpa smithi Povolný & Bradley, 1965
Scrobipalpa soffneri Povolný, 1964
Scrobipalpa solitaria Povolný, 1969
Scrobipalpa spergulariella (Chrétien, 1910)
Scrobipalpa splendens Povolný, 1973
Scrobipalpa spumata (Povolný, 2001)
Scrobipalpa stabilis Povolný, 1977
Scrobipalpa stangei (Hering, 1889)
Scrobipalpa staudei Bidzilya, 2021
Scrobipalpa strictella Bidzilya & Li, 2010
Scrobipalpa suaedella (Richardson, 1893)
Scrobipalpa suaedicola (Mabille, 1906)
Scrobipalpa suaedivorella (Chrétien, 1915)
Scrobipalpa suasella (Constant, 1895)
Scrobipalpa suaveolens (Povolný, 1996)
Scrobipalpa subnitens Povolný, 1969
Scrobipalpa subroseata (Meyrick, 1932)
Scrobipalpa substricta Povolný, 1967
Scrobipalpa superstes Povolný, 1977
Scrobipalpa swakopi Bidzilya & Mey, 2011
Scrobipalpa synurella Povolný, 1977
Scrobipalpa tereskeni (Falkovitsh & Bidzilya, 2006)
Scrobipalpa thymelaeae (Amsel, 1939)
Scrobipalpa tokari Huemer & Karsholt, 2010
Scrobipalpa traganella (Chrétien, 1915)
Scrobipalpa triangulella Li & Bidzilya, 2019
Scrobipalpa trifida (Povolný, 1987)
Scrobipalpa trinella (Fuchs, 1903)
Scrobipalpa tripunctella Li & Bidzilya, 2019
Scrobipalpa tristrigata (Meyrick, 1938)
Scrobipalpa turiensis Bidzilya, 2021
Scrobipalpa typica Bidzilya, 2021
Scrobipalpa ultima Povolný, 1969
Scrobipalpa uncispina (Povolný, 1987)
Scrobipalpa usingeri Povolný, 1969
Scrobipalpa ustulatella (Staudinger, 1871)
Scrobipalpa vaccans Povolný, 1969
Scrobipalpa varivansoni Bidzilya, 2021
Scrobipalpa vartianorum Povolný, 1968
Scrobipalpa vasconiella (Rössler, 1877)
Scrobipalpa vladimiri Povolný, 1966
Scrobipalpa voltinella (Chrétien, 1898)
Scrobipalpa voltinelloides Povolný, 1967
Scrobipalpa walsinghami Povolný, 1971
Scrobipalpa wieseri Bidzilya, 2021
Scrobipalpa wiltshirei Povolný, 1966
Scrobipalpa wolframi Bidzilya, 2021
Scrobipalpa zagulajevi Lvovsky & Piskunov, 1989
Scrobipalpa zaitzevi Piskunov, 1990
Scrobipalpa zhengi Li & Bidzilya, 2019
Scrobipalpa zhongweina Li & Bidzilya, 2019
Scrobipalpa zizera Povolný, 1969
Scrobipalpa zouhari Povolný, 1984

Former species
Scrobipalpa asiri Povolný, 1980
Scrobipalpa deleta Povolny, 1981
Scrobipalpa fraterna Povolný, 1969
Scrobipalpa gallincolella (Mann, 1872)
Scrobipalpa gorodkovi Bidzilya, 2012
Scrobipalpa gregori Povolný, 1967
Scrobipalpa klimeschi Povolny, 1967
Scrobipalpa milleri Povolny, 1977
Scrobipalpa rebeliella Hauder, 1917
Scrobipalpa sibirica Bidzilya, 2009
Scrobipalpa trebujenae Povolny, 1977
Scrobipalpa vicaria (Meyrick, 1921)
Scrobipalpa xylochroa Janse, 1963

Status unclear
Homaloxestis ocyphanes Meyrick, 1937
Lita melanella Heinemann, 1870
synonym: Lita nigripalpella Heinemann, 1870
Lita trochilella Heinemann, 1870
Phthorimaea pendens Meyrick, 1918

References

  2007: Esperiana Buchreihe zur Entomologie Memoir 4: 91-116.
 , 2011: Two new species of the genus Scrobipalpa Janse, 1951 from the Eastern Crimea (Lepidoptera: Gelechiidae). SHILAP Revista de Lepidopterología. 39 (156): 389-396.
 ;  2010: The genus Scrobipalpa Janse (Lepidoptera, Gelechiidae) in China, with descriptions of 13 new species. Zootaxa. 2513: 1–26.
 , 2011: New and little known species of Lepidoptera of southwestern Africa. Esperiana Buchreihe zur Entomologie. Memoir 6: 146-261.
 , 1984: Drei neue Arten der Tribus Gnorimoschemini (Lepidoptera, Gelechiidae) aus Asien. Nota lepidopterologica. 7 (3): 264-270.
 , 1987: Scrobipalpa (Euscrobipalpa) dagmaris sp. n. und andere interessante Entdeckungen bei den europäischen Gnorimoschemini (Lepidoptera, Gelechiidae). Nota lepidopterologica. 10(1): 79-86.
 , 2013: Description de trois nouvelles sous-espèces et de deux nouvelles espèces pour la Corse dont: Pleurota castagniccia sp. n. et Scrobipalpa corsicamontes sp. n. (Lepidoptera: Argyresthiidae: Oecophoridae: Gelechiidae). Association Roussillonnaise d'Entomologie. 22 (1): 27-34.
, 2019: New species and new records of the genus Scrobipalpa Janse (Lepidoptera, Gelechiidae) from China. ZooKeys. 840: 101–131.
, 2021: A review of the genus Scrobipalpa Janse, 1951 (Lepidoptera, Gelechiidae) in the Afrotropical region. Zootaxa. 5070 (1): 1–83.

External links

 
Gnorimoschemini